Shanaz Ibrahim Ahmed (born 1954) is a Kurdish Iraqi politician, writer, member of the Patriotic Union of Kurdistan, and current first lady of Iraq. Her husband is President Abdul Latif Rashid. She speaks Kurdish, Arabic, Persian and English, she is a daughter of the Kurdish writer, novelist and politician Ibrahim Ahmed, and a sister of former first lady of Iraq, Hero Ibrahim Ahmed.

Childhood 
She was born in the locality of Sabonkaran in 1954 in the Sulaymaniyah Governorate as the daughter of Ibrahim Ahmad, the founder of the Patriotic Union of Kurdistan.

Personal life 
She has two sons and one daughter with Abdul Latif Rashid, the President of Iraq.

References

1954 births
Living people
Iraqi Kurdistani politicians
Patriotic Union of Kurdistan politicians
21st-century Kurdish women politicians